Music is a 2023 European co-production between Germany, France, and Serbia drama film, written and directed by Angela Schanelec. Starring Aliocha Schneider and Agathe Bonitzer, the film is a modern retelling of the Greek myth of Oedipus. It competed for the Golden Bear at the 73rd Berlin International Film Festival, where it had its world premiere on 21 February 2023. Angela Schanelec won Silver Bear for Best Screenplay at the festival. It is scheduled to release in German cinemas on 4 May 2023.

Synopsis
Abandoned at birth in the Greek mountains on a stormy night, Jon is taken in and adopted, without having known his father or mother.

As a young man, he meets Iro, a warden in the prison where he is incarcerated after a deadly tragic accident. She seems to seek out his presence, takes care of him, records music for him. Jon’s eyesight begins to fail…

From then on, for every loss he suffers, he will gain something in return. Thus, in spite of going blind, he will live his life more fully than ever.

Cast
 Aliocha Schneider as Jon
 Agathe Bonitzer as Iro
 Marisha Triantafyllidou as Merope
 Argyris Xafis as Elias
 Theodore Vrachas as Lucian
 Ninel Skrzypczyk as Phoebe, 14 years old
 Frida Tarana as Phoebe, 6 years old
 Miriam Jakob as (Marta)
 Wolfgang Michael as Hugh

Production
The film was shot from 20 August 2021 to 5 October 2021 in Berlin, Brandenburg, Uckermark and Greece.

Release
Music had its  premiere on 21 February 2023 as part of the 73rd Berlin International Film Festival, in Competition. It was released in France on 8 March 2023 and in German cinemas on 4 May 2023.

Reception

On the review aggregator Rotten Tomatoes website, the film has an approval rating of 89% based on 9 reviews, with an average rating of 6.4/10. On Metacritic, it has a weighted average score of 70 out of 100 based on 5 reviews, indicating "Generally Favorable Reviews".

Jordan Mintzer of The Hollywood Reporter calling the film "Whistles its own tune" wrote, "It’s the celebration of a vision Schanelec has meticulously honed over the past three decades, like a late sonata by a composer who has fully come into their voice." Ben Croll reviewing for IndieWire graded the film B- and wrote, "For Schanelec, every frame is a manifesto — a canvas to initially cover in layers of meaning that must then be peeled back and stripped down until nothing but the most spartan brushstrokes remain." Jessica Kiang reviewing at Berlin Film Festival, for Variety began her review with maxim "Writing about music is like dancing about architecture" as she opined that her writing has "limitations of language". She wrote, "Schanelec is unlikely to vastly expand her fanbase here, but the tiny, fervent following she has accrued over the course of now 10 fantastically intricate features may be more than ever entranced by the fertile illogic of “Music"..." To Ola Salwa reviewing for Cineuropa the thing most appealed about the film was "its meditation on fate". Concluding, Salwa wrote, "In today’s culture, where control and influence – whether real or illusionary – are fetishised, Schanelec’s vision is refreshing, even though it is always clouded one way or another." Marina Ashioti writing in Little White Lies stated, "To decipher and derive meaning from a film this dense and obtuse is a Herculean task that only becomes easier when looking at it less a standalone feature, but rather as a fascinating addition to the filmmaker’s body of work." Nicholas Bell in IonCinema.com graded the film 3/5 and wrote, "A film inherently more interesting to discuss than it is to consume, especially considering her cast was arguably invited to abstain from conveying realistic emotions, its pleasures lie in the challenge of puzzling together these details and symbols."

Accolades

References

External links
 
 Music production website at Faktura film
 
 Music at Berlinale
 Music at Film portal 
 

2023 films
2023 drama films
Films directed by Angela Schanelec
German drama films
2020s Greek-language films
2020s German films
2020s French films
Serbian drama films
Films based on classical mythology